Warlock III: The End of Innocence is a 1999 direct-to-video horror film written by Bruce David Eisen and Eric Freiser and also directed by the latter. It is the third film in a series that started with the 1989 Warlock. The first two films star Julian Sands as the Warlock, but Warlock III stars Bruce Payne in the titular role of The Warlock.

The film was shot in Roger Corman's studio in Ireland.

Plot 

The story tells of a young girl called Kris who has no knowledge of her family, so when a historian tells her she has inherited a family house, she goes to see it. Also met is her boyfriend Michael, their friends Scott, Lisa, and Jerry, and her best friend Robin, who is a witch. Kris is haunted by visions and dreams of her past life and of a doll from her past life. A warlock, Phillip Covington, wanted her as a sacrifice until her mother used her own magic to trap him in the Catacombs of his home. Kris's night in the house is full of strange and supernatural events, including seeing an apparition of a young child. Jerry attempts to fix the pipes and accidentally breaks them, releasing Covington.

Kris goes to meet the historian the next day. Covington, who is posing as an architect, kills the historian, and destroys the letters from Kris's mother. Covington then toys with Kris and her friends, and convinces Jerry to steal Robin's talisman and a lock of her hair. Robin attempts to fight Covington with magic, but Covington is more experienced and wins, turning Robin into a glass statue and then shattering her. He then captures and tortures Kris's remaining friends to lure her to him.

Covington captures Kris, and he reveals that he plans to exchange her soul with a consort from hell to mother a race of evil. Kris escapes and fights back Covington, who begins to take a more demonic appearance. She takes the sacrificial blade and stabs him, however, Covington is unaffected by the knife. Kris then rips the doll from his hands and opens it, revealing a knife with which she stabs him in the heart, successfully killing him.

Kris leaves with a book of magic, reading the tarot card of strength and walking into a new life.

Cast
Bruce Payne – The Warlock/Phillip Covington
Ashley Laurence – Kris Miller
Catherine Siggins – Mrs. Miller 
Paul Francis – Michael
Jan Schweiterman – Jerry
Angel Boris – Lisa
Rick Hearst – Scott (as Richard C. Hearst)
Boti Bliss – Robin (as Boti Ann Bliss)

Reception

The film has received mixed reviews, although Bruce Payne's performance was praised. Richard Scheib, writing for The Science Fiction, Horror and Fantasy Film Review Database said that "as the Warlock, Bruce Payne, an actor who has magnificently theatrical charisma and presence is actually better in the part than the perpetually overwrought Julian Sands.". The film critic John Fallon stated that Payne gave "a charismatic, subdued scary performance" in the film and that he "couldn't take" his "eyes off him" as he was "all charm". Payne was described as a suave warlock by The Fresno Bee. The director of the film, Eric Freiser, stated that "in the first two movies, Julian was very smooth as the character, but Bruce makes for a scarier villain. You feel he is capable of more evil than Julian". John Fallon gave the film a score of three and a half out of four. A reviewer for Beyond Hollywood stated that the film is 'actually quite interesting, if a bit slow and plodding for the first hour'. A reviewer for A.V. club stated that 'it may be blandly competent, but everything about Warlock III seems painfully arbitrary'. In contrast, Richard Scheib stated that 'Warlock 3 is a halfway good film, certainly a lot better than the second one. It is rather flatly lit, but director Eric Freiser generates some often quite unusual atmosphere – like scenes where Ashley Laurence turns away from a mirror and unseen by her her reflection starts screaming; one victim being transformed into glass and then shattered; and a scene where Ashley Laurence thinks she has broken through a wall and runs away to freedom, only to become caught in a loop where she is not only running over and over but also watching herself run'.

References

External links 
 
 

1999 direct-to-video films
Direct-to-video sequel films
American supernatural horror films
1999 horror films
1999 films
Supernatural fantasy films
American dark fantasy films
Films about witchcraft
Trimark Pictures films
1990s English-language films
1990s American films